Marsh Lane may refer to;

Places
Marsh Lane, Derbyshire, in England 
Marsh Lane, Gloucestershire, in England 
Marsh Lane, Lincolnshire, in England 
Marsh Lane, Oxford, in England 
Railway stations
Marsh Lane railway station, Leeds
Marsh Lane & Strand Road station, now known as Bootle New Strand railway station
Roadways
Marsh Lane (Dallas)